The Ghost in Daylight is the fifth album by Gravenhurst, released on Warp Records.

Track listing
"Circadian" - 4:11
"The Prize" - 6:38
"Fitzrovia" - 8:08
"In Miniature" - 4:32
"Carousel" - 1:28
"Islands" - 8:05
"The Foundry" - 4:22
"Peacock" - 2:44
"The Ghost of Saint Paul" - 6:02
"Three Fires" - 4:16

Reception
The Guardian praised the album as "beautifully haunting". However, Pitchfork described it as "underplayed, and occasionally overly subtle".

References

2012 albums
Gravenhurst (band) albums
Warp (record label) albums